These are the official results of the Men's high jump event at the 1990 European Championships in Split, Yugoslavia, held at Stadion Poljud on  29 and 31 August 1990. There were a total number of 24 participating athletes.

Medalists

Result

Qualification
Qualification: Qualifying Performance 2.28 (Q) or at least 12 best performers (q) advance to the final.

Final

Participation
According to an unofficial count, 24 athletes from 15 countries participated in the event.

 (1)
 (1)
 (2)
 (1)
 (1)
 (1)
 (2)
 (1)
 (1)
 (2)
 (1)
 (1)
 (3)
 (3)
 (3)

See also
 1988 Men's Olympic High Jump (Seoul)
 1991 Men's World Championships High Jump (Tokyo)
 1992 Men's Olympic High Jump (Barcelona)
 1994 Men's European Championships High Jump (Helsinki)

References

 Results

High jump
High jump at the European Athletics Championships